On September 9, 2002, a magnitude 7.6 earthquake struck off the coast of Wewak, Sandaun Province, Papua New Guinea. The shallow reverse earthquake triggered a local tsunami measuring 5 meters high. The disaster resulted in at least 6 deaths, 70 injuries and building damage.

Tectonic setting
The island of New Guinea lies within the complex zone of collision between the Australian Plate and the Pacific Plate. Within this overall setting, the active tectonics of northern Papua New Guinea is dominate by the effects of continuing collision between the Huon–Finisterre island arc terrane with the edge of the Australian continental margin. The overall shortening is concentrated into two zones of thrust faulting, the Ramu–Markham fault zone, which forms the southwestern boundary of the Huon–Finisterre terrane, and the Highlands Thrust Belt, which lies further southwest and deforms the Australian margin. The hanging wall of the Ramu–Markham thrust system is broken up by a series of strike-slip faults. The orientation of these faults, parallel to the direction of thrusting, suggests that they accommodate distortion of the Huon–Finisterre block. Most of the seismicity in northern Papua New Guinea is associated with the Ramu–Markham fault system, with a smaller number of earthquakes occurring on the strike-slip faults and on the Highlands Thrust Belt.

Earthquake
The earthquake was the largest in the Aitape region since 1938. The overall magnitude ranges from 7.2 to 7.7. The United States Geological Survey estimates a magnitude of 7.6. It was caused by a rupture on a low-angle thrust fault in the New Guinea Trench. A fault measuring 72 km in length, and 36 km wide ruptured with a maximum slip of 2.1 meters.

Tsunami
A tsunami warning was issued in the region. In East Sepik, a  wave hit the area, destroying several homes. Ten-centimeter waves hit southern Japan. The tsunami was moderate in height; at 1.5 meters along most of the coastline. On several islands however, the run-up was 5 meters. The tsunami's western reach were at Sissano Lagoon and Aitape, which suffered extreme destruction during the 1998 earthquake and tsunami. The high tsunami run-ups in bays were due to the funnel-effect which increased the heights of the waves.

Damage and casualties
In Wewak, the closest town to the epicentre, at least 700 homes were damaged or destroyed, along with pipelines and a bridge. All schools in the town were temporarily closed. Three were killed when their houses collapsed. Seventy people were injured, and 3,000 people were made homeless. A woman succumbed to her injuries later at the hospital. Two more people, including a child were killed by the following tsunami. In West Sepik, ten homes and five water tanks were destroyed however no one was injured. Ubidnim village suffered severe liquefaction when water and sand erupted from the ground as high as 5 meters. Small uplifts of 30–40 cm was measured on several islands and the coast of Papua New Guinea. On Tarawai Island, two instances of uplift were observed, separated by an hour.

See also
 List of earthquakes in 2002
 List of earthquakes in Papua New Guinea
 1998 Papua New Guinea earthquake

References

2002 disasters in Asia
2002 earthquakes
2002 in Papua New Guinea
Earthquakes in Papua New Guinea
September 2002 events in Oceania
Tsunamis in Papua New Guinea
Sandaun Province
2002 disasters in Papua New Guinea